Prins Harald may refer to

Crown Prince Harald of Norway
, a World War II Norwegian cargo ship

See also
Prins, Harald, Dutch anthropologist and film maker